Tsarevich Simeon Alexeyevich (3 April 1665 - 18 June 1669) was the fourth son of Tsar Alexis of Russia and Maria Miloslavskaya, brother of Tsar Feodor III of Russia and Tsar Ivan V of Russia and half-brother of Tsar Peter the Great. He died young.

1665 births
1669 deaths
Russian tsareviches
House of Romanov
17th-century Russian people
Children of Alexis of Russia

Royalty and nobility who died as children